The 2011 European Women Sevens Championship – the ninth edition of the European Women's Sevens Championship.

F-EN League  
Venue/Date: 9 April 2011, Zagreb, Croatia.
Not all scores are available. 1st Hungary, 2nd Austria, 3rd Croatia, 4th Slovenia. The Croatian side was the club of Mladost.
Hungary 19-12 Austria
Hungary 22-0 Croatia
Hungary 44-0 Slovenia
Croatia 12-19 Austria
Slovenia 0-44 Austria
Croatia ?-? Slovenia

F-EN League
Venue/Date: 9 April 2011, Zagreb
All results not available

Croatia 0-22 Hungary
Austria 12-19 Hungary
Slovenia 0-42 Hungary

European Emerging Nations Camp Tournament
Venue/Date:'' 23–34 April 2011 at Zanka
Group A
'Pool 1'
Romania 21-5 Austria
Bulgaria 10-22 Poland
Austria 17-12 Bulgaria
Romania 7-10 Poland
Bulgaria 0-43 Romania
Austria 7-10 Poland

Pool 2
Czech Republic 29-0 Nada Split
Hungary 28-0 Denmark
Nada Split 0-14 Hungary
Czech Republic 24-12 Denmark
Hungary 12-21 Czech Republic
Denmark 40-0 Nada Split

Group B
Pool 1
Luxembourg 21-5 Crovenia (Croatia & Slovenia)
Crovenia 12-7 Czech Republic 'B'
Luxembourg 7-24 Czech Republic 'B'

Pool 2
Serbia 14-5 Slovakia
Slovakia 10-26 Poland 'B'
Serbia 12-17 Poland 'B'

9th-12th place
Crovenia 22-0 Slovakia
Serbia 22-5 Luxembourg
13th place
Czech Republic 'B' 29-0 Poland 'B'
11th place
Slovakia 5-31 Luxembourg
9th place
Crovenia 36-7 Serbia
7th place
Bulgaria 15-0 Nada Split
5th place
Austria 14-12 Denmark
3rd place
Romania 7-17 Hungary
Final
Poland 5-27 Czech Republic

F-EN LeagueVenue/Date: 19 May 2011, Wiener Sport Club Stadium, Vienna
All results not available

Austria 7-31 Hungary
Austria 19-15 Hungary

 FIRA-AER Tournament 2011 - Division 3 Venue/Date: 5–6 June 2011, Zanka, Hungary
 Following the promotion of Norway to Division 2, a Barbarians team was created to fill their place
Group A

Serbia 5-31 Hungary
Lithuania 15-22 Denmark
Hungary 36-0 Slovenia
Lithuania 26-12 Serbia
Denmark 38-0 Slovenia
Hungary 24-5 Lithuania
Denmark 33-0 Serbia
Lithuania 33-0 Slovenia
Hungary 26-10 Denmark
Slovenia 0-31 Serbia

Bowl semi-finals (5th-8th)
Lithuania 17-5 Barbarians
Luxembourg 15-17 Serbia

Bowl final (5th/6th)
Lithuania 31-0 Serbia

7th/8th place
Barbarians 12-29 Luxembourg

9th/10th place
Bosnia & Herzegovina 31-0 Slovenia
Group B

Barbarians 0-33 Poland
Georgia 33-0 Luxembourg
Poland 34-0 Bosnia & Herzegovina
Georgia 34-7 Barbarians
Luxembourg 19-0 Bosnia & Herzegovina
Poland 7-26 Georgia
Luxembourg 15-12 Barbarians
Georgia 43-0 Bosnia & Herzegovina
Poland 14-5 Luxembourg
Bosnia & Herzegovina 0-40 Barbarians

Semi-finals
Hungary 10-12 Poland
Georgia 21-26 Denmark

Final
Poland 24-0 Denmark

3rd/4th place
Hungary 7-28 Georgia

 FIRA-AER Tournament 2011 - Division 2 Venue/Date: 2–3 July 2011, Riga, Latvia
Following the promotion of Romania to the Top 12, Norway were promoted from Division 3 to replace them
Group A

Czech Republic 19-0 Norway
Andorra 5-17 Bulgaria
Switzerland 30-0 Israel
Bulgaria 0-31 Norway
Czech Republic 10-7 Israel
Switzerland 43-0 Andorra
Israel 0-38 Norway
Switzerland 62-0 Bulgaria
Andorra 0-22 Czech Republic
Bulgaria 12-7 Israel
Andorra 5-14 Norway
Switzerland 22-7 Czech Republic
Andorra 12-7 Israel
Czech Republic 33-0 Bulgaria
Switzerland 22-5 Norway

Bowl (9th-12th)
Semi-finals
Andorra 0-14 Latvia
Israel 5-10 Malta
11th/12th place
Andorra 10-0 Israel
9th/10th place
Latvia 14-0 Malta

Plate (5th-8th)
Semi-finals
Norway 5-10 Austria
Bulgaria 0-34 Belgium
7th/8th place
Norway 25-5 Bulgaria
5th/6th place
Austria 10-5 Belgium
Group B

Austria 36-7 Malta
Latvia 0-10 Croatia
Belgium 0-33 Ukraine
Croatia 27-0 Malta
Austria 0-31 Ukraine
Belgium 14-7 Latvia
Ukraine 55-0 Malta
Belgium 5-24 Croatia
Latvia 0-12 Austria
Croatia 7-43 Ukraine
Latvia 0-5 Malta
Belgium 17-12 Austria
Latvia 0-50 Ukraine
Austria 0-31 Croatia
Belgium 19-0 Malta

Cup (1st-4th)
Semi-finals
Switzerland 17-0 Croatia
Czech Republic 0-47 Ukraine
3rd/4th place
Croatia 7-14 Czech Republic 
Final: 1st/2nd place
Switzerland 0-41 Ukraine

 FIRA-AER Tournament 2011 - Top 12 Venue/Date:''' 16–17 July 2011, Bucharest, Romania
Wales originally entered, but withdrew on 2 March. As a result, Romania moved up from Division 2

Group A

England 46-0 Romania
Italy 27-12 Germany
Spain 42-0 Sweden
Germany 37-0 Romania
England 20-5 Sweden
Spain 21-5 Italy
Sweden 29-14 Romania
Spain 42-0 Germany
Italy 7-20 England
Germany 31-17 Sweden
Italy 34-7 Romania
Spain 5-15 England
Italy 10-5 Sweden
England 33-7 Germany
Spain 50-0 Romania

Bowl (9th-12th)
Semi-finals
Sweden 24-5 Finland
Moldova 10-7 Romania
11th/12th place
Finland 10-40 Romania
9th/10th place
Sweden 15-12 Moldova

Plate (5th-8th)
Semi-finals
Italy 7-14 France
Portugal 28-10 Germany
7th/8th place
Italy 12-14 Germany
5th/6th place
France 17-7 Portugal
Group B

Russia 41-0 Finland
France 5-12 Portugal
Netherlands 47-0 Moldova
Portugal 27-0 Finland
Russia 34-0 Moldova
Netherlands 14-12 France
Moldova 19-10 Finland
Netherlands 12-5 Portugal
France 7-24 Russia
Portugal 31-0 Moldova
France 43-7 Finland
Netherlands 10-17 Russia
France 27-0 Moldova
Russia 7-0 Portugal
Netherlands 34-0 Finland

Cup (1st-4th)
Semi-finals
England 14-0 Netherlands
Russia 0-31 Spain
3rd/4th place
Netherlands 12-0 Russia
Final
England 17-7 Spain

References

Rugby Europe Women's Sevens
2011 rugby sevens competitions
Sevens